Saturday Night Sing Along with Mitch is an album by Mitch Miller & The Gang. It was released in 1960 on the Columbia label (catalog nos. CL-1414 and CS-8211).

The album debuted on Billboard magazine's popular albums chart on April 4, 1960, peaked at No. 8, and remained on that chart for 40 weeks. It was certified as a gold record by the RIAA.

Track listing
Side 1
 "Dancing with Tears in My Eyes"
 "Silver Moon"
 "Bye Bye Blackbird"
 "Poor Butterfly"
 Medley: "Too-Ra-Loo-Ra-Loo-Ral That's An Irish Lullaby" and "Mother Machree"
 "Now Is the Hour"

Side 2
 "Baby Face"
 Medley: "I Wonder What's Become of Sally?" and "Ain't She Sweet"
 "I'm Looking Over a Four Leaf Clover"
 Medley: "The Man on the Flying Trapeze" and "Ta-Ra-Ra-Boom-De-E"
 "Sing Along"
 Medley: "Little Brown Jug" and "After the Ball"

References

1960 albums
Columbia Records albums
Mitch Miller albums